Radkersburg Umgebung is a former municipality in the district of Südoststeiermark in the Austrian state of Styria. Since the 2015 Styria municipal structural reform, it is part of the municipality Bad Radkersburg with combined population of 3158 inhabitants.

Population

References

Cities and towns in Südoststeiermark District